Jaakko Pellinen is a Finnish professional ice hockey forward who currently plays for Ilves of the SM-liiga.

References

1988 births
Living people
Ice hockey people from Tampere
Finnish ice hockey forwards
Ilves players